The Patriots–Steelers rivalry is a National Football League (NFL) rivalry between the New England Patriots and the Pittsburgh Steelers. The Patriots and Steelers are the two most storied franchises in the Super Bowl era, the Patriots and Steelers have played each other intermittently since the 1970s, but the two teams did not become full-fledged rivals until the late 1990s, when they became Super Bowl contenders. The rivalry would reach new heights during the 2000s and 2010s when both teams, led by quarterbacks Tom Brady and Ben Roethlisberger for the Patriots and Steelers respectively, posted winning seasons and several playoff appearances during this time period with both teams making it to the Super Bowl and taking home more than one Lombardi trophy. The two met each other in three AFC championship games during the 2000s and 2010s in which the Patriots defeated the Steelers each time and eventually made their way to the Super Bowl, winning a title in each appearance. Despite the Patriots' dominant reign over the NFL from 2001 to 2019, the Steelers would still prove themselves to be a consistent playoff contender during that time period with three Super Bowl appearances and two Super Bowl victories. However, the Steelers would be more successful in the postseason during the 2000s than in the 2010s. In 2020, CBS Sports ranked the Patriots-Steelers rivalry as the 8th best NFL rivalry of the 2000s.

History
The Steelers initially dominated the rivalry, winning 10 of its first 13 meetings with the Patriots. But in the 1996 AFC Divisional Round, the Patriots routed the Steelers 28–3 at Foxboro Stadium, ending Pittsburgh's five-game winning streak against New England. It also began a stretch where the Patriots won 14 of the next 20 meetings with the Steelers, including four of five postseason matchups. The Patriots would go on to reach and then lose Super Bowl XXXI against the Green Bay Packers.  The following year, also in the divisional round, the Steelers exacted revenge at Three Rivers Stadium, winning by a 7–6 score to reach their third AFC championship game in four years. This was also the only playoff meeting in which the winner did not eventually advance to the Super Bowl, as the Steelers lost to the eventual champion Denver Broncos in the AFC championship game. Earlier that season, the Steelers overcame a 14–0 deficit to beat the Patriots on the road 24–21 in overtime. In that game, quarterback Kordell Stewart managed a game-tying drive late in the fourth quarter culminating in a touchdown to Mark Bruener and a two-point conversion to Yancey Thigpen. In overtime, placekicker Norm Johnson won the game with a 31-yard field goal. The win gave the Steelers a first-round bye and ensured a home game in the divisional round.

In the 2001 season, the Steelers finished with the top seed in the AFC at 13–3. Meanwhile, the Patriots overcame an early-season injury to Drew Bledsoe, and led by then-second year quarterback Tom Brady and coached by Bill Belichick, rallied to finish second at 11–5. The two teams met in the AFC championship game at Heinz Field, and with Bledsoe replacing Brady due to injury, the Patriots upset the Steelers 24–17 and went on to win their first Super Bowl.

The 2004 season saw the emergence of Ben Roethlisberger as the Steelers' starting quarterback. En route to a 15–1 season, Roethlisberger and the Steelers ended the Patriots' record 21-game winning streak on October 31, taking home a 31–24 victory. The Steelers entered the AFC championship game having won all 15 games Roethlisberger started in his rookie season. However, the streak ended at home as New England defeated Pittsburgh 41–27 en route to winning their third Super Bowl championship. The defeat also prevented the Steelers from facing their in-state rival Philadelphia Eagles, who had clinched the NFC championship.

The Patriots and Steelers would not meet in the postseason again until 2016. Between those playoff meetings, the Steelers made three Super Bowl appearances and won two (Super Bowl XL and XLIII), while the Patriots also made three Super Bowls but won only once (Super Bowl XLIX). Facing each other at Gillette Stadium in the AFC championship game, the Patriots again routed the Steelers 36–17 and went on to win their fifth Super Bowl. The Patriots would win their sixth Super Bowl two seasons later, tying the Steelers with the most Super Bowl championships.

Game results

|-
| 
| style="|Steelers  33–3
| Three Rivers Stadium
| Steelers  1–0
| First meeting in the series. Most lopsided Steelers win in the series.
|-
| 
| style="|Steelers  21–17
| Schaefer Stadium
| Steelers  2–0
| Steelers win Super Bowl IX.
|-
| 
|style="|Patriots  30–27
| Three Rivers Stadium
| Steelers  2–1
| 
|-
| 
|style="|Steelers  
| Schaefer Stadium
| Steelers  3–1
| Steelers win Super Bowl XIV.
|-

|-
| 
| style="|Steelers  
| Three Rivers Stadium
| Steelers  4–1
| 
|-
| 
| style="|Steelers  37–14
| Three Rivers Stadium
| Steelers  5–1
| 
|-
| 
|style="|Patriots  28–23
| Three Rivers Stadium
| Steelers  5–2
| 
|-
| 
|style="|Patriots  34–0
| Three Rivers Stadium
| Steelers  5–3
| Most lopsided Patriots win in the series. Also the largest margin of victory in the series.
|-
| 
|style="|Steelers  28–10
| Three Rivers Stadium
| Steelers  6–3
| 
|-

|-
| 
| style="|Steelers  24–3
| Three Rivers Stadium
| Steelers  7–3
| 
|-
| 
| style="|Steelers  20–6
| Three Rivers Stadium
| Steelers  8–3
| 
|-
| 
|style="|Steelers  17–14
| Three Rivers Stadium
| Steelers  9–3
| 
|-
| 
|style="|Steelers  41–27
| Three Rivers Stadium
| Steelers  10–3
| Steelers lose Super Bowl XXX.
|-
! 1996 playoffs
! style="|Patriots  28–3
! Foxboro Stadium
! Steelers  10–4
! AFC Divisional Round. First postseason meeting in the series. Patriots host first playoff game since 1978. Largest margin of victory in a playoff game in the series. This was the only Patriots' home victory over the Steelers prior to the Tom Brady era. Patriots lose Super Bowl XXXI.
|-
| 
|style="|Steelers  
| Foxboro Stadium
| Steelers  11–4
| Final meeting at Foxboro Stadium
|-
! 1997 playoffs
!style="|Steelers  7–6
! Three Rivers Stadium
! Steelers  12–4
! AFC Divisional Round. Kordell Stewart's 40-yard touchdown run in the first quarter proved to be the winning score. Most recent NFL playoff game in which neither team scored at least 10 points.
|-
| 
|style="|Patriots  23–9
| Three Rivers Stadium
| Steelers  12–5
| Final meeting at Three Rivers Stadium
|-

|-
! 2001 playoffs
!style="|Patriots  24–17
! Heinz Field
! Steelers  12–6
! AFC Championship Game. First meeting at Heinz Field.  First start in the series for Tom Brady. Later replaced by Drew Bledsoe due to injury. Patriots win Super Bowl XXXVI.
|-
| 
|style="|Patriots  30–14
| Gillette Stadium
| Steelers  12–7
| First meeting at Gillette Stadium.
|-
| 
|style="|Steelers  34–20
| Heinz Field
| Steelers  13–7
| First start in the series for Ben Roethlisberger. Steelers end Patriots' record 21-game winning streak.
|-
! 2004 playoffs
!style="|Patriots  41–27
! Heinz Field
! Steelers  13–8
! AFC Championship Game. Patriots win Super Bowl XXXIX.
|-
| 
|style="|Patriots  23–20
| Heinz Field
| Steelers  13–9
| Steelers win Super Bowl XL.
|-
| 
|style="|Patriots  34–13
| Gillette Stadium
| Steelers  13–10
| Patriots complete 16–0 regular season. Patriots lose Super Bowl XLII. 
|-
| 
|style="|Steelers  33–10
| Gillette Stadium
| Steelers  14–10
| Steelers' first win at Gillette Stadium. Steelers win Super Bowl XLIII.
|-

|-
| 
| style="| Patriots  39–26
| Heinz Field
| Steelers  14–11
| Steelers lose Super Bowl XLV.
|-
| 
| style="|Steelers  25–17
| Heinz Field
| Steelers  15–11
| Patriots lose Super Bowl XLVI.
|-
| 
| style="| Patriots  55–31
| Gillette Stadium
| Steelers  15–12
| Highest scoring game in the series.
|-
| 
| style="| Patriots  28–21
| Gillette Stadium
| Steelers  15–13
| NFL Kickoff Game.
|-
| 
| style="| Patriots  27–16
| Heinz Field
| Steelers  15–14
| 
|-
! 2016 playoffs
! style="| Patriots  36–17
! Gillette Stadium
! Tied  15–15
! AFC Championship Game. Last postseason meeting to date. Patriots surpass the Steelers for most Super Bowl appearances. Patriots win Super Bowl LI.
|-
| 
| style="| Patriots  27–24
| Heinz Field
| Patriots  16–15
| Patriots take first lead in the series. In the closing seconds, Jesse James of the Steelers appeared to have scored a go-ahead touchdown that would have clinched the AFC's #1 seed, but after review, the call was overturned ruling that Jesse James didn't maintain control of the ball. Two plays later, Duron Harmon's interception of Ben Roethlisberger sealed the win for the Patriots, who would instead finish as the AFC's #1 seed. Patriots lose Super Bowl LII.
|-
| 
| style="|Steelers  17–10
| Heinz Field
| Tied  16–16
| Patriots win Super Bowl LIII.
|-
| 
| style="| Patriots  33–3
| Gillette Stadium
| Patriots  17–16
| Final start in the series for Tom Brady and Ben Roethlisberger.
|-

|-
| 
| style="| Patriots  17–14
| Acrisure Stadium
| Patriots  18–16
| First start in the series for Mac Jones and Mitchell Trubisky
|-
| 
| 
| Acrisure Stadium
| 
|
|-

|-
| Regular season
| style="|
| Patriots 5–4
| Steelers 11–9
| 
|-
| Postseason
| style="|
| Patriots 2–0
| Patriots 2–1
| AFC Divisional playoffs: 1996–1997. AFC Championship Game: 2001, 2004, 2016.
|-
| Regular and postseason 
| style="|
| Patriots 7–4
| Steelers 12–11
| 
|-

See also
 National Football League rivalries

Notes and references

National Football League rivalries
New England Patriots
Pittsburgh Steelers
New England Patriots rivalries
Pittsburgh Steelers rivalries